The Parque Festival México is a future theme park in Zapotlanejo, Mexico. Construction started on April 3, 2009. It will be built in four phases, and when finished it will have a theme park, an aquatic park, a shopping mall, and a hotel. The theme park is projected to open in 2012, with the entire project being completed in 2024. The Wyatt Design Group is involved in planning and designing this project.

References

Tourist attractions in Jalisco
Amusement parks in Mexico
2010 establishments in Mexico